The 6594th Test Group was a United States Air Force Unit stationed in Hawaii at Hickam Air Force Base from 1958 until it was inactivated in 1986.

The 6594th Test Group was established in 1958 to support U.S. Air Force Systems Command missile and space development operations in the Western Pacific area. It also provided support to the U.S. Coast Guard and Honolulu Joint Rescue Coordination Center on an as-available, non-interference basis.

Large portions of the Test Group's mission were classified until 1995 when information concerning Project CORONA was declassified. The 6594th was largely concerned with retrieving film canisters, about the size of a garbage can, in midair that had been ejected from some of the United States' earliest spy satellites.

These canisters were among the first objects sent into space that were designed to survive re-entry. Upon entering the ionosphere, they could resemble a shooting, or falling, star. Thus, the unit's motto "To Catch a Falling Star".

Because retrieval occurred over water in the Pacific, rescue swimmers were a standard part of the mission crew. Thus, when the 6594th was not busy with their primary mission, they were often available to support the US Coast Guard and other agencies in Search and Rescue (SAR) missions. The 6594th Test Group had one of the best records for open water rescues in the U.S. Air Force.

Personnel

1985 helicopter crash
On 15 January 1985 an HH-53 helicopter, call sign Arris 01, from the 6594th Test Group crashed while attempting a shipboard rescue mission 544 miles northwest of Honolulu. All seven crew members were killed: Pilots Capt. David D. Mason, Capt. Steve Pindzola, 2Lt. Russell Ohl. Flight Engineers SSgt Kyle D. Marshall, SSgt Daniel R. Reihman. Pararescuemen SSgt John R. Gilbert, Sgt Robert A. Jermyn. The helicopter crashed when a main rotor blade broke creating an imbalance in the aircraft which caused the tail to break off while the helicopter hovered above the commercial ship, "Asian Beauty."  Captain Mason had been married only a few days and returned early from his honeymoon to volunteer for the flight. A memorial plaque in honor of the seven crew members is located in the yard of the chapel at Hickam Field. For more information, see the publication of the Hickam Field annual reports.

Aircraft
At the time of inactivation, Test Group's aircraft complement consisted of:
7 JC-130B
3 JC-130H
5 HH-53C
3 HC-130P

See also
Corona (satellite)
Air Force Satellite Control Facility

External links
https://web.archive.org/web/20060527190759/http://ax.losangeles.af.mil/axf/eaapgs/docs/hickamfonsi86.pdf
http://www.6594thtestgroup.org

Test 6594
Four digit groups of the United States Air Force
Military units and formations established in 1958
National Reconnaissance Office
1958 establishments in Hawaii